Giovanni Dominico Giaconi (1580–1624) was a Roman Catholic prelate who served as Bishop of Guardialfiera (1617–1624).

Biography
Giovanni Dominico Giaconi was born in Lecce, Italy in 1580.
On 9 January 1617, he was appointed during the papacy of Pope Paul V as Bishop of Guardialfiera.
On 22 January 1617, he was consecrated bishop by Felice Centini, Bishop of Macerata e Tolentino, with Giambattista Visconti, Bishop of Teramo, and Innico Siscara, Bishop of Anglona-Tursi, serving as co-consecrators. 
He served as Bishop of Guardialfiera  until his death in 1624.

References

External links and additional sources
 (for Chronology of Bishops) 
 (for Chronology of Bishops) 

17th-century Italian Roman Catholic bishops
Bishops appointed by Pope Paul V
1580 births
1624 deaths